Legislative Assembly elections in India were conducted for nine legislative assemblies in 2013. Voting in Chhattisgarh was held in two phases on 11 November and 19 November 2013. The Election Commission of India (ECI) successfully conducted elections in Tripura, Meghalaya and Nagaland in February and in Karnataka on 5 May. The elections in Chhattisgarh, Delhi, Madhya Pradesh and Rajasthan were conducted in December while the counting that took place on 8 December showed a clear majority for BJP in the states of Madhya Pradesh, Rajasthan and Chhattisgarh, while Congress retained the state of Mizoram and Delhi got a hung assembly, with no single party getting a clear majority.

Legislative Assembly

Tripura

Tripura had assembly elections on 14 February 2013. The eleventh general election to the Tripura Vidhan Saudha started after Tripura's Chief Election Officer of the election department, Ashutosh Jindal, announced the event on 11 January. According to the report by The Times of India, the chief election officer of the state told that the voter turnout across the state was 93.57%, which set the record for the country's highest-ever voter turnout, beating the previous record of 91.22 which was also set by Tripura in its 2008 assembly election.

Meghalaya

Meghalaya held elections on 23 February to elect its 21st government. Meghalaya had a voter turnout of 71.24%. Results: INC - 29, UDP - 7 (out of 60)

Nagaland

Nagaland held elections on 23 February, with a voter turnout of 92%.

Karnataka

The Karnataka Legislative Assembly election was held in single phase on 5 May 2013 in all the 224 assembly constituencies in Karnataka.

Delhi

The Delhi State Assembly elections of 2013 were held on 4 December 2013. Counting of votes was done on 8 December 2013. The voter turnout was 66%, highest for the state till date. The BJP emerged as the single-largest party, closely followed by the debutant Aam Aadmi Party. The Indian National Congress party, which governed the state for the last three consecutive terms, finished third.

Rajasthan

The Rajasthan State Assembly elections of 2013 were held on 1 December 2013 with voter turnout in 200* constituencies being 74.38%, the highest ever for the state. The counting was done on 8 December 2013. The main contest was between incumbent Indian National Congress and main opposition party Bhartiya Janta Party.

Out of the total number of candidates, there were 166 women and one eunuch contesting the polls.

*Elections in constituency Churu were adjourned due to death of a BSP candidate, Shri Jagdish.

Madhya Pradesh

The Madhya Pradesh State Assembly elections of 2013 were held on 25 November 2013 and counting was done on 8 December 2013. The State Election Commission said that Madhya Pradesh registered highest ever polling of above 70% in 2013. The previous high turn-out in MP was 69.58 percent in the 2008 assembly elections.

The main contest was between incumbent Bhartiya Janta Party and main opposition party Indian National Congress. However, BJP was the winner with more than 70% of majority in the assembly elections. Shivraj Singh Chouhan is likely to be the Chief Minister of the state for 3rd consecutive time.

Chhattisgarh

The Chhattisgarh State Assembly elections of 2013  were held in two phases, first on 11 November 2013 and second on 19 November 2013 and counting was done on 8 December 2013. The main contest was between incumbent Bhartiya Janta Party and main opposition party Indian National Congress.

Mizoram

The Mizoram State Assembly Elections 2013 was held on 25 November 2013 and the counting was done on 9 December 2013.

Local body elections
2013 Uttarakhand local body elections

See also
 V. S. Sampath

References

External links
  Election Commission of India

2013 elections in India
India
2013 in India
Elections in India by year